Paul Carrol Tabor (born November 30, 1956) is a former American football center and guard. He played for the Chicago Bears in 1980.  He is the identical twin brother of former NFL player Phil Tabor.

References

1956 births
Living people
American football centers
American football offensive guards
Oklahoma Sooners football players
Chicago Bears players